Gaetano Coronaro (18 December 1852 – 5 April 1908) was an Italian conductor, pedagogue, and composer. He was born in Vicenza and had his initial musical training there followed by study from 1871 to 1873 at the Milan Conservatory under Franco Faccio. He composed orchestral works, sacred music, and chamber pieces as well as five operas. La Creola, which premiered at the Teatro Comunale di Bologna in 1878, was the only one to have any success.

Coronaro had settled in Milan by 1876 where he conducted at La Scala and taught at the Milan Conservatory. In 1894 he was made professor of composition there. Amongst his students was the composer Arrigo Pedrollo. Coronaro died in Milan at the age of 55. His brothers, Antonio (1851–1933) and Gellio Coronaro (1863–1916) were opera composers as well. Antonio was also the organist at the Cathedral of Vicenza from 1885 until his death.

Operas
La Creola – opera seria in 3 acts, libretto by Eugenio and Maria Torelli-Vallier (Teatro Comunale, Bologna, 27 November 1878)
II malacarne – dramma lirico in 3 acts, libretto by Stefano Interdonato (Teatro Grande, Brescia, 20 January 1894)
Un curioso accidente – scena lirica in 1 act, libretto by Virginia Tedeschi-Treves after Goldoni (Teatro Vittorio Emanuele, Turin, 11 November 1903)
Enoch Arden – libretto by Antonio Fogazzaro after Tennyson (composed 1905, unperformed)
La signora di Challant – libretto by Giuseppe Giacosa from his play of the same name (composition date unknown, unperformed)

References

External links

1852 births
1908 deaths
People from Vicenza
Italian classical composers
Italian male classical composers
Italian opera composers
Male opera composers
Italian conductors (music)
Italian male conductors (music)
Milan Conservatory alumni
Academic staff of Milan Conservatory
19th-century Italian musicians
19th-century Italian male musicians